Trimerodytes yunnanensis is a species of snake in the family Colubridae. It is found in Thailand, the province Yunnan in China, and Burma. It is commonly known as the Yunnan water snake or Yunnan annulate keelback.

References 

Trimerodytes
Reptiles of Thailand
Reptiles of Myanmar
Reptiles of China
Reptiles described in 1998